Noelaerhabdaceae is a family of coccolithophorids. Some genera include: Emiliania W.W.Hay & H.P.Mohler, Gephyrocapsa Kamptner, and Reticulofenestra W.W.Hay, Mohler & M.Wade.

Genus
Reticulofenestra
Pyrocyclus
Pseudoemiliania
Noelaerhabdus
Gephyrocapsa
Emiliania
Crenalithus
Bekelithella

References 

Haptophyte families
Eukaryote families